"Gotti" (stylized in all caps) is a song by American rapper 6ix9ine for his re-released debut mixtape Day69: Graduation Day (2018). It was released commercially on April 10, 2018. The song was written by 6ix9ine alongside producer Flamm. It peaked at number 99 on the US Billboard Hot 100.

Music video 
An accompanying music video for the song premiered on WorldStarHipHop via its YouTube channel. It features 6ix9ine in the Dominican Republic at a private villa and on the streets handing out cash to locals.

Charts

References

External links 
  on SoundCloud

2018 singles
2018 songs
6ix9ine songs
Songs written by 6ix9ine

Hip hop soul songs
Trap music songs
American soul songs